Jiří Pospíšil (born 24 November 1975) is a Czech politician, who was leader of TOP 09 from November 2017 until November 2019. As a deputy for the Civic Democratic Party, Pospíšil served twice as Czech Minister of Justice: between 2006 and 2009 under Prime Minister Mirek Topolánek, and then again from 2010 to 2012 in the government of Petr Nečas. Pospíšil was a member of the Chamber of Deputies (MP) from 2002 to 2014.

Career
Born in Chomutov, Pospíšil graduated from the Faculty of Law at the University of West Bohemia in 1999. From 2009 to 2010, he was the Dean of the same faculty. From 2010 until June 2012 he was Justice Minister again, in the Government of Petr Nečas.

Pospíšil, a former member of the Civic Democratic Party (ODS), ran in the 2014 European Parliament election for TOP 09. He received the most preferential votes of all candidates in the election.

On 26 November 2017, he was elected leader of TOP 09, replacing co-founder Miroslav Kalousek. He stepped down as leader on 24 November 2019.

References

External links 
 Official biography

1975 births
Living people
Justice ministers of the Czech Republic
21st-century Czech lawyers
People from Chomutov
Civic Democratic Party (Czech Republic) MPs
MEPs for the Czech Republic 2014–2019
Civic Democratic Party (Czech Republic) Government ministers
TOP 09 MEPs
Civic Democratic Alliance politicians
University of West Bohemia alumni
Academic staff of the University of West Bohemia
Young Conservatives (Czech Republic) politicians
Leaders of TOP 09
MEPs for the Czech Republic 2019–2024
Members of the Chamber of Deputies of the Czech Republic (2013–2017)
Members of the Chamber of Deputies of the Czech Republic (2010–2013)
Members of the Chamber of Deputies of the Czech Republic (2006–2010)
Members of the Chamber of Deputies of the Czech Republic (2002–2006)